Live.com may refer to:
live.com, a URL used by Microsoft for their Outlook.com and OneDrive products
Windows Live, a discontinued brand name for a set of services and software products from Microsoft
Windows Live Personalized Experience, a web portal formerly known as live.com
Bing (search engine), a search engine formerly known as Windows Live Search and Live Search, whose URL was live.com until 2009
Outlook.com, an online email service formerly offering @live.com accounts

Microsoft websites